The Kutz Memorial Bridge is a bridge that carries Independence Avenue across the Tidal Basin in Washington, D.C., in the United States. Architect Paul Philippe Cret designed the multi-span plate girder bridge in 1941. The Alexander & Repass Company constructed the bridge, which the company completed in 1943. 

The bridge's name commemorates Brigadier General Charles Willauer Kutz, who served as Commissioner of Engineering for the District of Columbia during the first half of the 20th century. Following alterations, the bridge was dedicated in 1954.

References

External links
 

1943 establishments in Washington, D.C.
Bridges completed in 1943
Bridges in Washington, D.C.
Monuments and memorials in Washington, D.C.
Paul Philippe Cret buildings
Southwest (Washington, D.C.)